The 1932 United States presidential election in Massachusetts took place on November 8, 1932, as part of the 1932 United States presidential election, which was held throughout all contemporary 48 states. Voters chose 17 representatives, or electors to the Electoral College, who voted for president and vice president.

Massachusetts voted for the Democratic nominee, Governor Franklin D. Roosevelt of New York, over the Republican nominee, incumbent President Herbert Hoover of California. Roosevelt ran with Speaker of the House John Nance Garner of Texas, and Hoover ran with incumbent Vice President Charles Curtis of Kansas.

Roosevelt carried the state with 50.64% of the vote to Hoover’s 46.64%, a Democratic victory margin of 4.00%. Socialist candidate Norman Thomas came in a distant third, with 2.17%.

Massachusetts had once been a typical Yankee Republican bastion in the wake of the Civil War, voting Republican in every election from 1856 until 1924, except in 1912, when former Republican President Theodore Roosevelt had run as a Progressive candidate against incumbent Republican President William Howard Taft, splitting the Republican vote and allowing Democrat Woodrow Wilson to win Massachusetts with a plurality of only 35.53% of the vote. 

In 1920 and 1924, Republicans had carried Massachusetts by landslide margins, sweeping every county in the state, including a GOP victory in the city of Boston. 

However, in 1928, a coalition of Irish Catholic and other ethnic immigrant voters primarily based in urban areas turned out massively for Catholic Democrat Al Smith, making Massachusetts and neighboring Rhode Island the only states outside of the Solid South to vote Democratic that year, as Herbert Hoover won a third consecutive Republican landslide nationally. After 1912, 1928 was only the second time in history that Massachusetts had voted Democratic, and with 50.24% of the vote, Al Smith became the first Democratic presidential candidate ever to win a majority of the vote in Massachusetts.

Although Roosevelt was not a Catholic, the key to his victory in Massachusetts in 1932 was building on Smith’s winning coalition, and bringing ethnic Catholic voters into the broader Democratic coalition. With the embattled incumbent President Hoover failing to adequately address the Great Depression, economic issues would motivate 1928 Smith voters to remain loyal to the Democrats in 1932. 

However the state was still closely divided between the newly emerging Democratic majority coalition, and its traditional New England Republican roots, and consequently Massachusetts was one of FDR’s weakest victories. New England as a whole was Hoover's most favorable region, as 4 of Hoover's six state victories came from New England. So although FDR performed much more strongly than Smith nationwide, he only slightly outperformed Smith in Massachusetts. Thus as Roosevelt was elected nationally in a landslide, Massachusetts weighed in as about 14% more Republican than the national average. 

As Roosevelt won the state with the same coalition that had propelled Al Smith to victory four years earlier, the county map in 1932 remained exactly the same as it was in 1928, with only percentages, margins, and turnout shifting. Roosevelt won the state despite carrying only 4 of the state’s 14 counties. The most vital component to Roosevelt’s victory was the Democratic dominance in Suffolk County, home to the state's capital and largest city, Boston. Like Smith, Roosevelt took over 60% of the vote in Suffolk County. Another crucial victory for Roosevelt was in Hampden County, home to the city of Springfield. The remaining two counties that went to FDR were Bristol County, south of the Boston area, and rural Berkshire County in the far west of the state.

Results

Results by county

See also
 United States presidential elections in Massachusetts

References

Massachusetts
1932
1932 Massachusetts elections